Metheny Mehldau is a jazz album released in 2006 by Nonesuch Records. Most of the album is a duet between guitarist Pat Metheny and pianist Brad Mehldau. On two songs, they are accompanied by drummer Jeff Ballard and bassist Larry Grenadier.

Background
Mehldau wrote three songs, while Metheny wrote the rest. "Unrequited" appeared on Mehldau's album, Songs: The Art of the Trio, Vol. III (1998). Metheny's "Say the Brother's Name" is from I Can See Your House from Here (1994), an album he made with guitarist John Scofield. "Ahmid-6" was recorded by Bob Berg on his album Riddles (1994) .

Metheny Mehldau includes tracks from recording sessions that occurred in December, 2005. A second disc, Metheny Mehldau Quartet, was released in 2007 and contains more quartet and duet tracks from the same sessions.

Track listing

Personnel
 Pat Metheny – guitars, guitar synthesizer, liner notes
 Brad Mehldau – piano, liner notes
 Larry Grenadier – double bass (tracks 4 and 7)
 Jeff Ballard – drums (tracks 4 and 7)

References

Pat Metheny albums
Brad Mehldau albums
2006 albums
Instrumental duet albums